On the Beach is the eighth studio album by British singer-songwriter Chris Rea, released in 1986, and built on the success of the preceding Shamrock Diaries. It reached No. 11 on the UK Albums Chart (and also in Sweden), topped the Dutch charts (where it charted for more than nine months), reached number two in West Germany and No. 4 in New Zealand (where is also spent more than nine months in the charts). It also reached the top 10 in Norway. In 2019, a deluxe remastered version of the album was released.

Songs
In an interview for the deluxe edition of the album, Rea said of the song Giverny, written after a visit to Monet's celebrated home, "I didn't want to be there. I was only there because she (his wife, Joan) was there... so there's kinda, a funny twist to it".

Critical reception
AllMusic notes that, "while The Road to Hell shows the darker side of Rea's worldview, On the Beach is an excellent introduction to his brighter, more optimistic songwriting". 
A retrospective review finds that the album "taps into the same kind of jazzy, introspective pop/soul sound that the likes of John Martyn, Joni Mitchell and Van Morrison were flirting with in the same period, helped by an excellent band including Fairport Convention/XTC drummer Dave Mattacks", adding that Little Blonde Plaits is "a vehicle for [Max] Middleton's expressive Mini Moog, very redolent of his atmospheric playing on John Martyn’s Glorious Fool".

Track listing

Personnel 
 Chris Rea – lead and backing vocals, keyboards, acoustic piano, guitars, slide guitar, fretless bass
 Max Middleton – acoustic piano, Rhodes, Minimoog, synthesizers 
 Kevin Leach – keyboards
 Robert Awhai – guitars
 Eoghan O'Neill – bass guitar 
 Dave Mattacks – drums
 Adrian Rea – drums
 Martin Ditcham – percussion

Production 
 Chris Rea – producer 
 David Richards – producer, mixing
 Stewart Eales – recording engineer 
 Stylorouge – sleeve design
 Ekkeheart Gurlitt – photography
 Francoise La Port – photography

Studios
 Recorded at Anderburr Recording Studios (Bray, England).
 Mixed at Mountain Studios (Montreux, Switzerland).

Singles
 "It's All Gone" b/w "Crack That Mould", "Look Out For Me", "Bless Them All", "Let's Dance" (original version)
 "On the Beach" b/w "On the Beach (special remix)", "If Anybody Asks You", "One Golden Rule" (live), "Midnight Blue"
 "Hello Friend" (re-recording) b/w "Driving Home for Christmas" (original version), "It's All Gone" (live), "Steel River"

Charts

Weekly charts

Year-end charts

Certifications

References

Chris Rea albums
1986 albums
Albums produced by David Richards (record producer)
Magnet Records albums
Geffen Records albums